"Corazón Sin Vida" (Spanish for "Lifeless Heart"; stylized in all caps) is a song recorded by Spanish singer and songwriter Aitana in collaboration with Colombian pop singer Sebastián Yatra. Written by both performers alongside Andrés Torres and Mauricio Rengifo, the song was released on October 2, 2020, through Universal Music as the second single of Aitana's sophomore studio album 11 Razones released in December 2020. The track features a sample of Alejandro Sanz' 1997 signature single "Corazón Partío".

Background 
The song was conceived during a studio session with Andrés Torres and Mauricio Rengifo in Madrid in January 2020 while Yatra jumped on the song in May, shortly after hearing the solo demo. This marks a second collaboration between the two since a still unreleased track meant to be on Yatra's second studio album Fantasía (2019), was recorded in late 2018. During the summer of 2020, Aitana hinted a collaboration with a big Latin American singer for the second release of her upcoming album. On September 26, a trio collaboration featuring Aitana, Yatra and Alejandro Sanz was registered on ASCAP. Two days later, shortly after the Spanish singer scored a second Latin Grammy nomination for Best Pop Vocal Album, an initial teaser for "Corazón Sin Vida" was released on social media and YouTube. With a second teaser being released the day after, the cover art and release date were revealed.

Music video 
Due to international travel restrictions to prevent the spread of COVID-19, the music video had to be filmed remotedly, with Aitana being in Madrid and Yatra being in Miami. It was directed by Pablo Hernández. It tells the story of a couple who break up but still can't get each other out of their mind.

Charts

Certifications

Release history

References 

2020 songs
2020 singles
Aitana (singer) songs
Spanish songs
Songs written by Andrés Torres (producer)
Song recordings produced by Andrés Torres (producer)
Songs written by Sebastián Yatra